Jenu Goodu is a 1963 Indian Kannada film, directed by Y. R. Swamy and produced by T. Vasanna and S. Heera. The film stars K. S. Ashwath, Udaykumar, Rajashankar and Pandari Bai in lead roles. Jayanthi and Chandrakala both made their Kannada debut with this movie. The film has musical score by Vijaya Krishnamurthy. The film was a remake of the 1954 Bengali film Banga Kora  which in turn was based on the novel Bijila by Prabhavathi Devi Saraswathi. The Bengali movie was also earlier remade in Tamil as Kula Dheivam and in Hindi as Bhabhi. Pandari Bai reprised her role in all versions except Bengali.

Cast

Udaykumar
Pandari Bai
Jayanthi
Chandrakala
K. S. Ashwath
Rajashankar
Balakrishna
Narasimharaju
M. N. Lakshmidevi
 M. Jayashree

Soundtrack

References

External links
 

1963 films
1960s Kannada-language films
Kannada remakes of Bengali films
Films directed by Y. R. Swamy